The 2015–16 SMU Mustangs women's basketball team will represent Southern Methodist University in the 2015–16 NCAA Division I women's basketball season. The Mustangs will play their home games at Moody Coliseum. The 2015–16 season will be the third season the Mustangs will participate in the American Athletic Conference. The Mustangs, led by twenty-fifth year head coach Rhonda Rompola, finished the season 13–18, 7–11 in AAC play to finish in seventh place. They advanced to the quarterfinals of the American Athletic women's tournament where they lost to South Florida.

On February 22, Coach Rompola announced she will be retiring at the end of the season. She finished at SMU with a 25-year record of 438–314.

Media
All Pony Express games will air on KAAM. Before conference season home games will be streamed on Pony Up TV. Conference home games will rotate between ESPN3, AAC Digital, and Pony Up TV. Road games will typically be streamed on the opponents website, though conference road games could also appear on ESPN3 or AAC Digital.

Roster

Schedule and results

|-
!colspan=12 style=""| Non-conference regular season

|-
!colspan=12 style=""| AAC regular season

|-
!colspan=12 style=""| American Athletic Conference Women's Tournament

|-

See also
2015–16 SMU Mustangs men's basketball team

References

External links
SMU Mustangs women's basketball official website 

SMU Mustangs women's basketball seasons
SMU